Telipna erica is a butterfly in the family Lycaenidae. It is found in Cameroon, Gabon and the Democratic Republic of the Congo.

References

Butterflies described in 1904
Poritiinae